Lefroy is a rural locality in the local government area of George Town in the Launceston region of Tasmania. The 2016 census determined a population of 76 for the state suburb of Lefroy.

History
Originally known as Nine Mile Springs, the locality was named for Sir John Henry Lefroy, the Administrator of Tasmania in 1880. Lefroy was gazetted as a locality in 1967.

Geography
The Curries River forms the western boundary.

Road infrastructure
The B82 route (Bridport Road) follows part of the southern boundary. Route C807 (Big Hill Road / Shaw Street / Hope Street / Beechford Road) starts from an intersection with B82 and runs north through the locality and village before exiting in the north-west. Route C808 (Lefroy Road) starts from an intersection with B82 and runs north-west to the village, where it intersects with C807.

References

Localities of George Town Council
Towns in Tasmania